Cistus × rodiaei Verg. 1932 is a variety of rockrose.

They bloom from late April to early June.

References

External links
 Malvaceae.info
 Les galeries photos

rodiaei
Ornamental plant cultivars
Hybrid plants